Podstene (or Neubüchel) is a village in the Municipality of Kočevje in southern Slovenia. The area is part of the traditional region of Lower Carniola and is now included in the Southeast Slovenia Statistical Region. It no longer has any permanent residents.

History
Podstene was a Gottschee German village. In 1574 it consisted of four half-farms. There were five houses in the village before the Second World War. The village was burned by Italian troops in the summer of 1942, after which one house remained standing. A family lived in this house until 1967, running a farm and an inn, which was a popular destination for outings.

References

External links
Podstene on Geopedia
Pre–World War II list of oeconyms and family names in Podstene

Former populated places in the Municipality of Kočevje